Maldini Pali (born 27 January 1995) is an Indonesian footballer who plays as a winger.

International career
In 2010, Maldini represented the Indonesia U-16, in the 2010 AFC U-16 Championship. And in 2014 Maldini represented the Indonesia U-19, in the 2014 AFC U-19 Championship.

Honours

International
Indonesia U19
 AFF U-19 Youth Championship: 2013

References

External links
 Maldini Pali at Soccerway
 Maldini Pali at Liga Indonesia

1995 births
Living people
Sportspeople from West Sulawesi
Indonesian footballers
Association football midfielders
PSM Makassar players
Sriwijaya F.C. players
Persiba Balikpapan players
Bhayangkara F.C. players
Kalteng Putra F.C. players
Liga 1 (Indonesia) players
Liga 2 (Indonesia) players
Indonesia youth international footballers